Edward Joseph Dwight Sr. (February 25, 1905 - November 27, 1975) was a utility player in the Negro leagues. He played mostly for the Kansas City Monarchs.

He graduated from Sumner High School in Kansas City, Kansas.

After retiring from baseball, he went to work at Kansas State Grain laboratory where he worked as a chemist. In 1946, the Dwight family opened Dwight's Soda Grill in Kansas City, Kansas.

According to Dwight's wife, in taped interviews by Janet Bruce, Eddie Dwight worked as a bus driver for the Kansas City Monarchs into the team's later years, and continued to appear as a player. In 1962, Dwight's son Eddie Dwight Jr. became the first black American selected for training as an astronaut by NASA. He would later go on to become a sculptor. Some of his subjects have included Negro league baseball players.

Dwight died at the age of 70 in Kansas City, Kansas.

References

External links
 and Baseball-Reference Black Baseball stats and Seamheads

Indianapolis ABCs players
Indianapolis ABCs (1931–1933) players
Kansas City Monarchs players
1905 births
1975 deaths
People from Dalton, Georgia
20th-century African-American sportspeople